The 2011–12 Fordham Rams men's basketball team represented Fordham University during the 2011–12 NCAA Division I men's basketball season. The team was coached by Tom Pecora in his second year at the school. Fordham Rams home games were played at Rose Hill Gymnasium and the team is a member of the Atlantic 10 Conference.

On October 13, 2011, coaches and media predicted Fordham to finish in last in the Atlantic 10, receiving 29 votes. Chris Gaston was named to the Preseason All-Atlantic 10 Second Team.

Roster

Schedule and results

|-
!colspan=9| Exhibition
  
|-
!colspan=9| Regular Season

References

Fordham
Fordham Rams men's basketball seasons